Judy Walker may refer to:
 Judy L. Walker, American mathematician
Judy Walker, an injured victim in the 1986 Edmond post office shooting
Judy Walker, acting headteacher of the Prescot School in England as of its 2009 closure
Judy Walker, part of the winning women's team at the 1979 Canadian Junior Curling Championships
 Judy Walker, fictional babysitter on the Leave it to Beaver episode "No Time for Babysitters"; see Leave It to Beaver characters
 Judy Walker, fictional character in the 1937 film Rhythm in the Clouds
 Judy Walker, fictional character in Bridesmaids (2011 film)